State Politics & Policy Quarterly  is a peer-reviewed academic journal that covers research in the field of political science. The journal's editors are Jon Winburn, Conor Dowling, and Tracy Osborn. It was established in 2001 and is currently published by Cambridge University Press in association with the State Politics Section of the American Political Science Association.

Abstracting and indexing 
State Politics & Policy Quarterly is abstracted and indexed in Scopus and the Social Sciences Citation Index. According to the Journal Citation Reports, the journal has a 2017 impact factor of 1.425, ranking it 69th out of 169 journals in the category "Political Science".

References

External links 
 

SAGE Publishing academic journals
English-language journals
Quarterly journals
Publications established in 2001
Political science journals